The Juguang Tower is a tower in Jincheng Township, Kinmen County, Fukien Province, Republic of China (Taiwan).

History
The construction of the tower started in 1952 and was completed in the fall of 1953. It was built to commemorate the fallen armed forces during the Battle of Guningtou 4 years earlier.

Architecture
The tower ground covers an area of 6,612 m2. The tower was built with a traditional Chinese style with two cannons at the front of the tower, symbolizing the turbulent history of Kinmen. The architect who designed the tower is Sheng Xuie-hai. It is a three-story building with a cultural gallery inside it displaying documents and materials about the history and current status of Kinmen.

See also
 List of tourist attractions in Taiwan

References

1953 establishments in Taiwan
Buildings and structures in Kinmen County
Jincheng Township
Tourist attractions in Kinmen County
Towers in Taiwan